The 2023 PSSI U-20 Mini Tournament is a football tournament organized by the Football Association of Indonesia (PSSI) as part of the Indonesia U20 national team preparations for the 2023 FIFA U-20 World Cup which will be held in Indonesia.

This tournament was held on 17–21 February 2023 and was attended by 4 countries that managed to qualify for the 2023 FIFA U-20 World Cup finals including Indonesia.

Participating teams
 Indonesia (AFC; host)
 Fiji (OFC)
 Guatemala (CONCACAF)
 New Zealand (OFC)

Venue
The tournament itself was held at Gelora Bung Karno Main Stadium after previously there was talk that it would be held at Patriot Chandrabhaga Stadium.

Standings

Matches
All matches use the UTC+7 (WIB) time zone

List of goalscorers

References

External links

2023 in Indonesian football